The Apostolic Prefecture of Ulaanbaatar is a Roman Catholic Latin apostolic prefecture (pre-diocesan missionary jurisdiction) located in Mongolia, with its territory consisting of the entire country. 
 
Its cathedral episcopal see is the Cathedral of Saints Peter and Paul, in the capital city of Mongolia, Ulaanbaatar.

It is exempt, i.e. directly subject to the Holy See, not part of any ecclesiastical province.

On 28 August 2016, the Apostolic Prefecture of Ulaanbaatar celebrated the ordination of the first native Mongolian priest by Msgr. Wenceslao Padilla. Other seminarians are studying currently in South Korea.

History 
 Established on 14 March 1922 as Mission “sui iuris” of Outer Mongolia, on territory split off from the Apostolic Vicariate of Central Mongolia 
 Renamed in 1924 as Mission sui iuris of Urga (or Ulanbator) 
 Promoted on 8 July 2002 as Apostolic Prefecture of Ulaanbaatar, but still not entitled to a titular bishop.

Statistics 
As of 2014, the prefecture had 919 Catholics (0.03% of 3,227,000 total) on 1,564,120 km2 in six parishes and a mission with 17 priests (14 religious and three diocesan), 61 in religious life (43 female, 18 male) and 2 seminarians.

Ordinaries 
 All missionary members of Latin congregations, notably Scheutists

 Ecclesiastical Superiors of Outer Mongolia
 Apostolic Administrator Girolamo van Aertselaer, C.I.C.M. (1922 – 1924), also  Apostolic Vicar of the then Apostolic Vicariate of Chahaer 察哈爾 (China) & Titular Bishop of Zaraï (1898-05-07 – 1924-01-12)

 Ecclesiastical Superiors of Urga = Urgoo (or Ulaanbaatar)
 Apostolic Administrator Everard Ter Laak, C.I.C.M. (1924 – 5 May 1931), also Coadjutor Apostolic Vicar of Chahaer 察哈爾 (China) & Titular Bishop of Parœcopolis (1914-05-06 – 1931-05-05); previously Apostolic Vicar of Southern Kansu 甘肅南境 (China) (1906-06-21 – 1914-05-06) and Apostolic Vicar of Chahaer (China) (1924-01-12 – 1924-12-03); later Apostolic Vicar of Xiwanzi 西灣子 (China) (1924-12-03 – 1931-05-05)
 Fr. Wenceslao Selga Padilla, C.I.C.M. (19 April 1992 – 8 July 2002; see below)

 Apostolic Prefects of Ulaanbaatar
 Wenceslao Selga Padilla, C.I.C.M. (8 July 2002 – 25 September 2018), Titular Bishop of Tharros (2003-08-02 – 2018-09-25)
 Cardinal Giorgio Marengo, I.M.C. (2 April 2020 – present), Cardinal-Priest of San Giuda Taddeo Apostolo (2022–present)

See also 
 List of Catholic dioceses (structured view)

Sources and external links
 GCatholic.org, with incumbent biography links - data for all sections
 Catholic Hierarchy

Apostolic prefectures
Roman Catholic dioceses in Mongolia
Christian organizations established in 1922
Roman Catholic dioceses and prelatures established in the 20th century
Organizations based in Ulaanbaatar
1922 establishments in Mongolia